Anna Belousova (born 23 August 1996) is a female Russian swimmer. She is the 2019 Russian National Champion at 100 meters breaststroke.

Early life and education 
Belousova was born in Russia on 23 August 1996. Since 2017, she has been a student Texas A&M University, planning to major in leadership.

Career 
In swimming, Belousova won the 100 metres breastroke gold medal at the 2019 Russian National Championships in Moscow, Russia, on 12 April. Belousova is a member of the Aggie Swim Club.

References

External links 
 Anna Belousova at collegeswimming.com

Russian female swimmers
1996 births
Living people
Russian female breaststroke swimmers